Symplocos deflexa is a tree in the family Symplocaceae, native to Borneo. The specific epithet deflexa means "drooping" and refers to the orientation of the infructescence.

Description
The inflorescences feature racemes, each of up to six fragrant flowers.

Distribution and habitat
Symplocos deflexa is endemic to Borneo, where it is confined to areas of Ranau District in Sabah, including Mount Kinabalu and Tenompok Forest Reserve.

References

deflexa
Endemic flora of Borneo
Flora of Sabah
Plants described in 1894
Taxa named by Otto Stapf